Napiabad (also Romanized as Napīābād; also known as Nabīābād) is a village in Chelo Rural District, Chelo District, Andika County, Khuzestan Province, Iran. At the 2006 census, its population was 147, in 24 families.

References 

Populated places in Andika County